is a Japanese light novel series written by Nisio Isin and illustrated by Take. The series is published by Kodansha under the Kodansha Box imprint. The story revolves around a katanagari, or "sword hunt" for 12 weapons that were created by a single swordsmith. An anime adaptation by White Fox began airing on January 26, 2010, and consisted of 12 episodes. A single episode of the series was aired each month. NIS America have licensed the series and released the first part on a Blu-ray/DVD combo set in July 2011. Part two was released on September 20, 2011. The anime series aired once more on Fuji TV's noitamina between April and November 2013 as the block's first rerun, with a new opening and a new ending song.

Plot and setting

Katanagatari is the story of Yasuri Shichika, a swordsman who fights without a sword, and Togame, an ambitious young strategist who seeks to collect 12 legendary swords for the shogunate. Shichika is the son of an exiled war hero and the seventh head of the Kyotouryuu school of fighting who lives on the isolated Fushou Island with his elder sister, Nanami. Togame seeks him out because his bare-handed fighting style means that he will not be corrupted by the power of the swords. Togame, who has been betrayed before, convinces Shichika to accompany her on a mission to locate the Deviant Blades. They embark on a journey together across Edo-era Japan to collect the Deviant Blades, all wielded by formidable opponents.

The Deviant Blades
 The main focus of the story is the gathering of twelve distinct weapons that were crafted by Kiki Shikizaki, a reclusive swordsmith. His bladework had been widely popular during the last war, but now twelve of the one thousand swords he made have been named "Deviant" because they are rumored to have been specially crafted via alchemy, the occult, and other mystical means. Although they are supposedly "katana", not all of them are swords, but they do have a distinctive feature or ability and different forms, such as a suit of armor, a dagger, and a pair of guns. It is also rumored that the people wielding them are prone to their "poison" and will do anything to keep the weapon to themselves. Later it is revealed that Shikizaki was seeking to create the ultimate Deviant Blade which becomes in fact the Yasuri family's bare-handed Kyotōryū fighting style, and is fulfilled during Shichika's journey.

 The first blade retrieved by Shichika and Togame from Koumori Maniwa. The blade is straight unlike most katanas, and it is the hardest blade with the ability to never break or bend. The hilt is neatly decorated with plum flower designs. This blade is strongly based on the real life Dōtanuki.

 The second blade recovered was in the possession of Ginkaku Uneri. It is the sharpest blade with the ability to cut through anything, in sharp contrast to its ironic name, meaning "blunt". It was also made specifically for unsheathing at incredible speeds. The katana has triangular patterns around its hilt guard and a black sheath.

 Considered to be one sword, it actually comprises 1000 swords, with the last 999 being copies of the first. All 1000 of them are in the possession of Meisai Tsuruga. It has the ability to overwhelm its enemy with its sheer numbers. What makes them stand out is their red sheaths. However, despite their identical appearances, Shichika is able to identify the original sword.

 An extremely thin blade as per its namesake, meaning "needle", it is in the possession of Hakuhei Sabi. It is the brittlest blade as the blade itself is made of glass, which gives it its light weight, and is rather fragile if used incorrectly. The sheath and hilt are white and decorated with floral patterns.

 A massive full set of armor, it is in the possession of Kanara Azekure. It is the most defense-oriented blade with the ability to protect the user from any damage, especially against attacks that have armor-piercing properties. Its design was based on Western armor, and it has numerous blades around it. The armor is decorated with many references to the ocean, such as shells and a helmet that's based on a whale.

 A large, blunt-looking, stone sword, it comes into the possession of Konayuki Itezora. It is extremely heavy, capable of leaving a crater even when it is simply dropped. Only Konayuki is capable of wielding it with extreme ease and it can crush the enemy with its weight. The sword can also be held by its tip, and used as a hammer instead, hence its "double" title.

 A small yellow kunai-like weapon, it comes into the possession of Nanami Yasuri. It holds electricity within it and was designed with the appearance of a lightning bolt. It is the most evil blade with the ability to rejuvenate the user's body.

 A four-armed, four-legged, solar powered clockwork mechanical doll that seems to function on its own. It has the ability to think by itself and adapt to any situation. It wears a kimono and tall black shoes. Each of its arms hold a sword, and an extra one is hidden in its mouth. Its appearance, made in the image of the woman its creator loved, changes according to the situation, becoming more menacing.

 A wooden sword that sharply contrasts its title as "King of Swords", it is in the possession of Zanki Kiguchi. Unlike the other Deviant Blades, it doesn't have any of the poison found in Shikizaki's blades. It is the purest blade with the ability to cure the poison the other swords have on their owners. A small floral mark and yellowish streak on the sword identifies it as Nokogiri.

 A sword with no blade, it is in the possession of Rinne Higaki. The blade itself is not meant to "cut" anyone other than its owner. The hilt (tsuka) is black and decorated with orange floral patterns, and a wreath of flowers circle as the guard (tsuba). It is the most trustworthy blade with the ability to weigh the user's heart.

 A black, jagged katana decorated with iridescent designs, obtained by Houou Maniwa. The blade also gives off a dark cloudy aura. This blade originally has no owner as it was found inside of a crystal-like spire in a cave, preserving it. It is the most poisonous blade with the ability to corrupt the user. The blade itself contains a part of the spirit of Shikizaki within it.

 A pair of handguns, one a blue six-chambered revolver and the other a red semi-automatic that holds eleven bullets, both are in the possession of Princess Hitei and used by her retainer, Emonzaemon. Each is decorated with a long flowing mane with a bead on its end. The guns appear to fire an unlimited amount of ammunition, as Emonzaemon is not seen reloading them even after firing dozens of rounds.

 The Kyotōryu style itself, as a bare-handed style founded by Shichika's ancestor, Kazune Yasuri, along with Shikizaki. In contrast with the other twelve swords, which are labeled as "Perfected Deviant Blades," Kyotōryu is called by Shikizaki a "Completed Deviant Blade," as Shichika had "forged" it himself throughout his journeys, as was Shikizaki's intent with its creation. Due to the nature of Kyotōryu, this "sword" is by nature antithetical to the other twelve.

Media

Light novels
Katanagatari was released one volume a month throughout 2007. A spin-off novel, Maniwagatari, was released a year later. During their panel at Anime Boston on March 30, 2018, English light novel publisher Vertical announced that they had licensed the series. They released it as four 3-in-1 omnibus volumes from November 2018 to August 2020.

Anime
The anime is composed of a dozen 50-minute episodes and follows the two main characters while they are searching for the katanas, except for one episode that is centered on Nanami Yasuri. In each episode, Shichika and Togame collect a katana or a new one will be introduced. The length of the episodes is unusual since most anime have 24-minute episodes and run weekly instead of monthly. A new episode would be released every month, beginning on January 26, 2010, and finishing on December 11, 2010.

For the first half of the series (episodes 1–7), the opening theme is Meiya Kadenrō (冥夜花伝廊) by Minami Kuribayashi while the second half of the series (episode 8–12) is Katana to Saya (刀と鞘) by ALI PROJECT. However, the ending theme changes for each episode. For the noitamina rerun, the new opening theme song was Hakushukassai Utaawase by supercell, and Piko performed the new ending theme song Kotonoha.

Drama CD
A Drama CD in twelve chapters, titled Episode 0: Kyotō Yasuri and written by Nisio Isin, was released with the DVD/BDs of the series. It is set during the rebellion twenty years before the events of the series. Each chapter has a character from the series narrating the episode.

 Chapter 1
 Read by Togame (: Yukari Tamura)
 Chapter 2
 Read by Uneri Ginkaku (: Mitsuru Miyamoto)
 Chapter 3
 Read by Tsuruga Meisai (: Atsuko Yuya)
 Chapter 4
 Read by Sabi Hakuhei (: Hikaru Midorikawa)
 Chapter 5
 Read by Kanara Azekura (: Tsuyoshi Koyama)
 Chapter 6
 Read by Princess Hitei (: Tomatsu Haruka)
 Chapter 7
 Read by Nanami Yasuri (: Mai Nakahara)
 Chapter 8
 Read by Emonzaemon Sōda (: Rikiya Koyama)
 Chapter 9
 Read by Kiguchi Zanki (: Shizuka Itō)
 Chapter 10
 Read by Rinne Higaki (: Miyako Itō)
 Chapter 11
 Read by Hōō Maniwa (: Ryōtarō Okiayu)
 Chapter 12
 Read by Shichika Yasuri (: Yoshimasa Hosoya)

Reception
In 2019, Polygon named Katanagatari as one of the best anime of the 2010s.

References

External links
  
  
 
 ANN vol 1 review
 ANN vol 2 review

2007 Japanese novels
Action anime and manga
Anime and manga based on light novels
Kodansha books
Light novels
Nisio Isin
Noitamina
Romance anime and manga
Samurai in anime and manga
Television shows written by Makoto Uezu
Vertical (publisher) titles
White Fox